The O'Sullivan Twins is the second in the St. Clare's series of children's novels by Enid Blyton.  It was first published in 1942.

Plot summary
The newly sensible Pat and Isabel O'Sullivan depart for their second term at St Clare's, with their Cousin Alison joining them. Alison's character is airheaded and ditzy, but also a decent and kind-hearted person.

Other new characters include Lucy Oriell and Margery Fenworthy. Lucy is the archetypal school story girl — bright, kind and popular — although she is portrayed well, without the one-dimensional flatness this type of character can often have. Her father is a painter and Lucy herself is a talented artist. Margery is sulky, sullen, rude, antisocial and the other girls suspect she is older than them, nearer to sixteen years old.

Events include a midnight tea party for second former Tessie, which is discovered by Mamzelle through the machinations of another second former, Erica. Erica causes trouble for the first and second formers throughout the year, and is finally trapped in a fire which results in a thrilling rescue by Margery, who becomes a heroine. Lucy's father is involved in an accident rendering him unable to paint, and therefore unable to pay St Clare's school fees, but she is helped by the twins and her new friend, Margery. There is also excitement when Janet puts beetles into Mamzelle's spectacle case and then the girls pretend they can't see them, leaving Mamzelle to believe she is going mad.

Characters in this book;

 Pat O'Sullivan
 Isabel O'Sullivan
 Alison O'Sullivan
 Margery
 Lucy Oriell
 Tessie
 Nora
 Erica (antagonist)
 Winifred James
 Belinda Towers
 Hilary Wentworth
 Mam'zelle
 Doris Elward
 Miss Roberts
 Matron
 Janet Robins
 Miss. Theobald
 Kathleen Gregory
 Shelia Naylor
 Rita George
 Miss Lewis
 Winnie
 Miss Jenks
 Katie White

External links
Enid Blyton Society page

1942 British novels
St. Clare's novels
1942 children's books
Methuen Publishing books